The Luxembourg Basketball Federation also known as FLBB, is the governing body of basketball in Luxembourg. It was founded in 1934, and became members of FIBA in 1946.

The Luxembourg Basketball Federation operates the Luxembourg men's national team and Luxembourg women's national team. They organize national competitions in Luxembourg, for both the men's and women's senior teams and also the youth national basketball teams.

The top professional league in Luxembourg is the Total League.

Current Teams
AB Contern
Amicale Steesel
Arantia Larochette
AS Soleuvre
Avanti Mondorf 2000
Bascharage Hedgehogs
Basket Esch
BBC KÄLDALL
Berbourg Espérants Pirates
Black Frogs Schieren
Black Star Mersch
Diekirch
Etzella Ettelbruck
Gréngewald Hueschtert
Kehlen
Kordall Steelers
Les Sangliers Wooltz
Mambra Mamer
Mess
Musel Pikes
Nitia Bettembourg
North Fox
Racing Luxembourg
Rebound Préizerdaul
Red Miners Käldall
Résidence Walferdange
Sparta Bertrange
Special Olympics Luxembourg
T71 Dudelange
Telstar Hesperange
US Heffingen
VIBBALL Echternach
Zesummen Aktiv

See also
Luxembourg men's national basketball team
Luxembourg women's national basketball team

External links
Official website 
Luxembourg at FIBA site

Basketball in Luxembourg
Basketball governing bodies in Europe
Basketball
Sports organizations established in 1934